Mahalakshmi is an Indian actress and dancer who primarily works in Malayalam language films and television shows.

Career 
She studied at Carmel Girls’ Higher Secondary School and practiced Bharatanatyam and Kuchipudi while in school. She worked as a child artiste in Thilakkam (2003) and Pattanathil Sundaran (2003). She made her lead debut with Ardhanaari (2012). She also played the lead in the television serial Sivakami on Surya TV.

Personal life 
She married Nirmal Krishna on 15 December 2019.

Filmography 
All films are in Malayalam, unless otherwise noted.

Television 
Kunjali Marakkar (Asianet)
Ulladakkam (Amrita TV) 
Autograph (Asianet)
Swamiye Saranamayyappa (Surya TV) 
Sreekrishnan (Surya TV) 
Ramayanam (Mazhavil Manorama) 
Veera Marthanda Varma (Surya TV) 
Sivakami (Surya TV)
Moonu Pennungal (Surya TV)
Sree Kaleeswari - album
Don't Do Don't Do - Game ShowSaregma'' - Game Show
 Ningalkkumakam Super Chef
 Munch Stars

References 

Living people
Actresses in Malayalam cinema
Actresses in Tamil cinema
Actresses in Malayalam television
Television personalities from Kerala
Indian female dancers
Year of birth missing (living people)